
Year 420 BC was a year of the pre-Julian Roman calendar. The denomination 420 BC for this year has been used since the early medieval period, when the Anno Domini calendar era became the prevalent method in Europe for naming years.

Events 
 By place 
 Greece 
 The young and popular Alcibiades is elected "Strategos" (one of a board of ten generals) and begins to dominate Athenian life and politics. A Quadruple Alliance of Athens, Argos, Mantineia and Elis, which has been organised by Alcibiades (in opposition to Nicias) confronts a Spartan-Boeotian alliance.

 By topic 
 Drama 
 Euripides' play The Suppliant Women is performed.
 Euripides' play Phaethon is performed.

Births

Deaths 
 Protagoras, Greek presocratic philosopher (b. c. 490 BC)

References